The Kochergasse is one of the streets in the Old City of Bern, the medieval city center of Bern, Switzerland. It is part of the Innere Neustadt which was built during the expansion of 1255 to 1260. It runs in front of the Bundeshaus East and it is part of the UNESCO Cultural World Heritage Site that encompasses the Old City.

History 

Until 1740, Kochergasse was known as Judengasse (Jewish Lane) after the Judentor (Jewish Gate). The Judentor was originally a fortified tower on the western city wall. The tower was built between 1458 and 1473. It was demolished around 1678 to make way for the Ballenhaus.

Between 1740 and 1917 it was known as Inselgasse after the Inselspital (Island Hospital). It was changed in 1917, in memory of Emil Theodor Kocher.

References 

Streets in Bern
Old City (Bern)